The Bell AH-1 SuperCobra is a twin-engined attack helicopter that was developed on behalf of, and primarily operated by, the United States Marine Corps (USMC). The twin Cobra family, itself part of the larger Huey family, includes the AH-1J SeaCobra, the AH-1T Improved SeaCobra, and the AH-1W SuperCobra.

The Super Cobra was derived from the single-engined AH-1 Cobra, which had been developed during the mid-1960s as an interim gunship for the U.S. Army. The USMC had quickly taken an interest in the type, but sought a twin-engined arrangement for greater operational safety at sea, along with more capable armaments. While initially opposed by the Department of Defense, who were keen to promote commonality across the services, in May 1968, an order for an initial 49 twin-engine AH-1J SeaCobras was issued to Bell. The type entered service during the final months of the US's involvement in the Vietnam War, seeing limited action in the theatre as a result.

The USMC promptly sought greater payload capacity than that provided by the original Sea Cobra; thus the AH-1T, equipped with the dynamic systems of the Model 309 and a lengthened fuselage, was produced by Bell during the 1970s. In the following decade, in response to the denial of funding to procure the Boeing AH-64 Apache attack helicopter, the USMC opted to procure a more capable variant of the AH-1T; equipped with revised fire control systems compatible with new munitions, such as the AGM-114 Hellfire anti-tank missile, the new model, designated AH-1W, commenced delivery in 1986. Seeking to further develop the type, Bell opted to develop the extensively redesigned and modernised Bell AH-1Z Viper during the 1990s and 2000s.

The Sea Cobra was involved in multiple major operations during the latter half of the twentieth century, such as during the United States invasion of Grenada in 1983. During the Iran–Iraq War of the 1980s, Iranian Sea Cobras were intensely used, proving itself to be capable in both anti-armor and anti-aircraft warfare. Turkey, who operated numerous Cobras and Super Cobras, used the type on multiple occasions against Kurdistan Workers' Party (PKK) insurgents. On numerous occasions in the 1990s, USMC AH-1s were deployed during the Gulf War of the early 1990s, as well as for the United States invasion of Haiti in 1994, and the US intervention in the Yugoslav Wars in the late 1990s. In the twenty-first century, the type also saw action in the multi-decade War in Afghanistan, and the 2003 invasion of Iraq. During October 2020, the USMC withdrew the last of its AH-1Ws in favour of exclusively operating the AH-1Z.

Design and development

The AH-1 Cobra was developed in the mid-1960s as an interim gunship for the U.S. Army for use during the Vietnam War. The Cobra shared the proven transmission, rotor system, and the Lycoming T53 turboshaft engine of the prolific UH-1 "Huey" utility helicopter. By June 1967, the first AH-1G HueyCobras had been delivered. Between 1967 and 1973, Bell manufactured 1,116 AH-1Gs for the U.S. Army; these Cobras chalked up in excess of one million operational hours in the Vietnam theatre.

The U.S. Marine Corps became particularly interested in the AH-1G Cobra, but expressed its preference for a twin-engined configuration that would provide improved safety in over-water operations. Furthermore, the service also sought a more potent turret-mounted weapon. Initially, the Department of Defense had balked at providing the Marines with a twin-engine version of the Cobra in the belief that commonality with the Army's AH-1Gs outweighed the advantages of a different engine arrangement. However, the Marines won out; thus, during May 1968, Bell received a contract for 49 twin-engine AH-1J SeaCobras. The AH-1J was also equipped with a more powerful gun turret in the form of the three-barrel 20 mm XM197 cannon, which was based on the six-barrel M61 Vulcan cannon. As an interim measure, the U.S. Army transferred 38 AH-1Gs to the Marines in 1969.

During the 1970s, the Marine Corps requested greater load carrying capability in high temperatures for the Cobra. Bell used systems from its Model 309 to develop a new model, the AH-1T, that was provisioned with a lengthened tailboom and fuselage as well as the upgraded transmission and engines from the Model 309. Bell designed the AH-1T to be more reliable and easier to maintain in the field. The version was given full TOW missile capability with targeting system and other sensors. An advanced version, known as the AH-1T+, that was equipped with more powerful T700-GE-700 engines and advanced avionics, was proposed to Iran in the late 1970s, but the overthrow of the Shah of Iran in the late 1970s resulted in the sale being canceled.

In the early 1980s, the Marine Corps sought a new navalized helicopter; accordingly, it evaluated the Boeing AH-64 Apache attack helicopter over a two week period in September 1981, which included shipboard operation tests. Furthermore, various concepts were studied at this time. However, the service's require for funding to purchase the AH-64 was denied by Congress that same year. As an alternative option, the Marines procured a more powerful version of the AH-1T. Other changes included modified fire control systems to carry and fire AIM-9 Sidewinder and AGM-114 Hellfire missiles. The new version, which was funded by Congress, received the AH-1W designation. During March 1986, deliveries of the AH-1W SuperCobra commenced, eventually totaling 179 new-built helicopters along with the upgrading of 43 existing AH-1Ts.

During the late 1990s, Bell was negotiating to acquire the Romanian state-managed helicopter manufacturer IAR Brașov with the intention of establishing an overseas production line for the AH-1W for multiple export customers. In May 1997, the company signed an agreement with the Romanian State Ownership Fund to buy the government's 70 percent stake in IAR Brașov. However, during November 1999, following protracted negotiations, Bell announced that it had abandoned its acquisition efforts, and thus the overseas production initiative, after the Romanian government had allegedly ceased responding to its proposals.

The AH-1T+ demonstrator and AH-1W prototype were later tested with a new experimental composite four-blade main rotor system. The new configuration offered better performance, reduced noise, and improved battle damage tolerance. Lacking a USMC contract, Bell developed this new design into the AH-1Z with its own funds. By 1996, the Marines were again prevented from ordering the AH-64. Developing a marine version of the Apache would have been expensive and it was likely that the Marine Corps would be its only customer. Instead, the service signed a contract for the upgrading of AH-1Ws into AH-1Zs.

The Bell AH-1Z Viper retained much of the AH-1W's design, but also features several major changes. The AH-1Z's two redesigned wing stubs are longer with each adding a wingtip station for a missile such as the AIM-9 Sidewinder. Each wing has two other stations for 70 mm (2.75 in) Hydra rocket pods, or AGM-114 Hellfire quad missile launcher. The Longbow radar can be mounted on a wingtip station. During October 2020, the last AH-1Ws were phased out of service with the Marine Corps in favour of the AH-1Z.

Operational history

United States

These were termed Marine Hunter-Killer (MARHUK) Operations and lasted from June to December 1972. As such, the type participated in the final American combat operations in Vietnam. Several AH-1Js were present to cover the evacuation of the US Embassy in Saigon in April 1975.

During 1983, Marine Cobras took part in the invasion of Grenada. They were typically used to perform close air support and helicopter escort missions; a total of two AH-1Ts were shot down and three crew members killed. That same year, Marine AH-1s were also deployed off the coast of Beirut, Lebanon, amid the Lebanese civil war in support of the Multinational Peacekeeping Force. In this theatre, the AH-1s were typically armed with Sidewinder missiles and guns, which were intended to be used as an emergency air defense measure to counter the threat of light civil aircraft being piloted by suicide bombers.

During the mid 1980s, the AH-1W variant entered service with the USMC. Between, 1986 to 1999, the service took delivery of 179 Super Cobras.

In the late 1980s, in response to the Tanker War of the wider Iran–Iraq War, USMC Cobras were dispatched for Operation Earnest Will in the Persian Gulf to escort shipping and deter attacks upon them. It was during these missions that Cobras sank three Iranian patrol boats while losing a single AH-1T to Iranian anti-aircraft fire. USMC Cobras from  flew "top cover" during an evacuation of U.S. and other foreign citizens from Liberia in 1990.

During the Gulf War, 78 Marine SuperCobras were deployed, flying a total of 1,273 sorties in Iraq. While no combat losses were reportedly incurred, three AH-1s were lost to accidents either during and after the combat operations. The AH-1W units were credited with destroying 97 tanks, 104 armored personnel carriers and vehicles, and two anti-aircraft artillery sites during the 100-hour ground campaign.

USMC Cobras were also used in various other operations throughout the 1990s. The type provided support for the U.S. humanitarian intervention in Somalia, Operation Restore Hope, during 1992–1993. They were also employed during the U.S. invasion of Haiti during 1994. USMC Cobras were used in U.S. military interventions in the former Yugoslavia in the 1990s; specifically, two AH-1Ws assisted in the rescue of USAF Captain Scott O'Grady, after his F-16 was shot down by a SAM in June 1995.

During the twenty-first century, USMC Cobras participated in Operation Enduring Freedom in Afghanistan and in Operation Iraqi Freedom in the conflict in Iraq. While new replacement aircraft were considered as an alternative to major upgrades of the AH-1 fleet, Marine Corps studies showed that an upgrade was the most affordable, most supportable and most effective solution for the Marine Corps light attack helicopter mission.

During the opening phase of the 2003 invasion of Iraq, SuperCobras were deployed on the front lines, often flying in hunter-killer teams with Bell UH-1 Iroquois utility helicopters and other coalition aircraft. Reportedly, 46 of the 58 USMC AH-1s deployed sustained battle damage, which was mostly from infantry-type weapons.<ref name=rand>John, Gordon IV. et al Assessment of Navy Heavy-Lift Aircraft Options  p. 87. RAND Corporation, 2005. Accessed: 18 March 2012.  Quote: "46 of 58 USMC Cobras) took battle damage, mostly from infantry-type weapons, such as machine guns, RPGs, and small arms fire."</ref> AH-1Ws were involved in the rescue of Private First Class Jessica Lynch from an Iraqi hospital.

In late August 2016, Marine AH-1W Cobras flying from  started flying combat missions over Sirte, Libya against the Islamic State of Iraq and the Levant in Libya, providing close air support for friendly militias on the ground. In the later stages of the operation, AH-1Ws flew combat missions from the deck of  after that ship replaced Wasp in October 2016.

In October 2020, the U.S. Marine Corps retired the last of its AH-1Ws after 34 years of service, having replacing the type with the Bell AH-1Z Viper. By the time of their retirement, the model had collectively accumulated 933,614 flight hours.

Iran

In 1971, Iran purchased 202 examples of an improved AH-1J, named "AH-1J International", from the United States. This model featured improvements such as the uprated P&WC T400-WV-402 engine and a strengthened drivetrain. Furthermore, recoil damping gear was fitted to the 20 mm M197 gun turret, while the gunner was provided with a stabilized sight along with a stabilized seat. Of the AH-1Js operated by the Imperial Iranian Army Aviation, 62 were capable of using the TOW missile.

Iranian AH-1Js participated in the Iran–Iraq War—which saw the most intensive use of helicopters in any conventional war. Iranian AH-1Js (particularly the TOW-capable ones) were "exceptionally effective" in anti-armor warfare, inflicting heavy losses on Iraqi armored and vehicle formations. In operations over the barren terrain in Khuzestan and later in southern Iraq, beside the standard tactics, Iranian pilots developed special, effective tactics, often in the same manner as the Soviets did with their Mi-24s. Due to the post-Revolution weapons sanctions, Iranians had to make do with what was at hand: they equipped the AH-1Js with AGM-65 Maverick missiles and used them with some success in several operations.

Starting from October 1980, the AH-1Js engaged in air-to-air combat with Iraqi Mil Mi-24 helicopters on several, separate occasions during the Iran–Iraq War. The results of these engagements are disputed. One document cited that Iranian AH-1Js took on Iraqi Mi-8 and Mi-24 helicopters. Sources report that the Iranian AH-1 pilots achieved a 10:1 kill ratio over the Iraqi helicopter pilots during these engagements (1:5). Additionally, one source states that ten Iranian AH-1Js were lost in the war, compared to six Iraqi Mi-24s lost. The skirmishes are described as fairly evenly matched in another source. The Mi-24 was faster and more powerful, but the AH-1J was more agile. There were even engagements between Iranian AH-1Js and Iraqi fixed-wing aircraft. The AH-1Js scored three confirmed kills against MiG-21s, claimed a Su-20, and shared in the destruction of a MiG-23—all using their 20 mm M197 cannon.

During early 1984, an Iranian AH-1J Sea Cobra was shot down by an Iraqi Pilatus PC-7 during Operation Kheibar (Iranian pilots Reza Moghadam and Mohammad Yazdi were rescued). About half of the AH-1Js were lost during the conflict to combat, accidents, and simple wear and tear. Ali Akbar Shiroodi and Ahmad Keshvari were two distinguished Iranian Cobra pilots during Iran-Iraq War and are considered wartime heroes in Iran. During 1988, two Soviet MiG-23s shot down a pair of Iranian AH-1Js that had strayed into western Afghan airspace.

Into the twenty-first century, Iranian AH-1Js remain in service with the Islamic Republic of Iran Army Aviation and have undergone indigenous upgrade programs. By the 2020s, there was an increasing expectation that, amid a combination of factors such as accumulated fatigue, increasingly outdated capabilities, and a shortage of spare components, Iran will probably seek to replace its AH-1Js before too long, possibly with Russian-sourced Mi-24s.

Taiwan

During 1984, Taiwan announced its requirement for attack helicopters; it subsequently evaluated the MBB Bo 105 and MD 500 helicopters. The requirement resulted in an order for 42 AH-1W SuperCobras being placed during 1992. Deliveries of this batch ran from 1993 to 1997. During 1997, it was announced that an additional 21 AH-1Ws had been ordered. The Ministry of National Defense assigned the helicopters to the ROC Army Aviation Training Centre and a pair of Army Aviation attack helicopter brigades. During the 2010s, Taiwan began supplementing its SuperCobras with 30 newly-purchased AH-64Es. Into the 2020s, Taiwan continues to operate its SuperCobras; during January 2021, a NT$339.24 million (US$11.91 million) contract with the US was signed for the provision of technical support and spare parts the AH-1W fleet through to September 2027.

Turkey
During the early 1990s, Turkey bought ten AH-1W SuperCobras; these were supplemented by 32 ex-US Army AH-1 Cobras. The sale was politically controversial in the United States; in April 1996, the purchase of ten additional AH-1Ws by Turkey was blocked by the Clinton administration. During late 2011, Turkey requested the purchase of three AH-1Ws from the USMC inventory.

The AH-1s have been repeatedly used in combat against Kurdistan Workers' Party (PKK'') insurgents. On 13 May 2016, PKK militants shot down a Turkish Army AH-1W SuperCobra using a 9K38 Igla (SA-18 Grouse) MANPADS; in the published video, the missile severed the tail section from the rest of the helicopter, causing it to spin, fragment in midair and crash, killing the two pilots on board. The Turkish government initially stated that it had descended due to technical failure, though it later became clear that the helicopter had been shot down. Amid the 2016 Turkish coup d'état attempt, Turkish Cobras were alleged to have fired upon several police vehicles.

During April 2022, all of the Turkish Army's remaining AH-1Ws were transferred to the Turkish Navy; they are the first type of attack helicopter to be operated by the service. Being already appropriately suited to maritime operations, the AH-1Ws are to be used onboard TCG Anadolu amphibious assault ship; as such, the type has been speculated to have displaced a planned navalised version of the indigenously-built TAI/AgustaWestland T129 ATAK attack helicopter.

Variants

Single-engine
 For AH-1G, AH-1Q through AH-1S/P/E/F and other single-engine variants, see Bell AH-1 Cobra.

Twin-engine

AH-1J SeaCobra
 Original twin engine version.
AH-1J International
 Export version of the AH-1J SeaCobra.
AH-1T Improved SeaCobra
 Improved version with extended tailboom and fuselage and an upgraded transmission and engines.
AH-1W SuperCobra
 ("Whiskey Cobra"), day/night version with more powerful engines and advanced weapons capability.
AH-1(4B)W Viper
 "Four-Bladed Whiskey" test version with a four-bladed bearingless composite main rotor based on Bell 680 rotor. A prototype was converted from AH-1T 161022.
AH-1Z Viper
 A new variant nicknamed "Zulu Cobra", and developed in conjunction with the UH-1Y Venom for the H-1 upgrade program. The variant includes an upgraded four-blade main rotor and adds the Target Sight System (TSS).

Bell 309 KingCobra
 Experimental all-weather version based on the AH-1G single-engine and AH-1J twin-engine designs. Two Bell 309s were produced; the first was powered by a PW&C T400-CP-400 Twin-Pac engine set and the second was powered by a Lycoming T-55-L-7C engine.
CobraVenom
 Proposed version for the United Kingdom.
AH-1RO Dracula
 Proposed version for Romania.
AH-1Z King Cobra
 AH-1Z offered for Turkey's ATAK program; selected for production in 2000, but later canceled when Bell and Turkey could not reach an agreement on production.

Panha 2091 Unlicensed Iranian upgrade of AH-1J International.
IAIO Toufan Iranian copy / re-manufactured AH-1J International by Iran Aviation Industries Organization, with locally sourced avionics, and weapons.

Operators

Current

 Islamic Republic of Iran Army Aviation

 Republic of China Army

 Turkish Navy

Former
 Imperial Iran
 Imperial Iranian Army Aviation

 Republic of Korea Army

 United States Marine Corps (AH-1J and AH-1W variants)
 HMLA-167
 HMLA-169
 HMLA-267
 HMLA-269
 HMLA-367
 HMLA-369
 HMLA-467
 HMLA-469
 HMLA-773
 HMLAT-303

Aircraft on display

United States
AH-1J
157771 - Prairie Aviation Museum in Bloomington, Illinois
157784 – Flying Leatherneck Aviation Museum at MCAS Miramar, San Diego, California
159211 - Kalamazoo / Battle Creek, Michigan
159212 - Yankee Air Museum, Belleville, Michigan
159218 - New York Intrepid Sea, Air & Space Museum Pier 86, New York, New York

AH-1W
 160820- National Museum of the Marine Corps, Quantico, Virginia
 160825- Pima Air and Space Museum, Tucson, Arizona
 161017- Hickory Aviation Museum, Hickory, North Carolina
 162558- Barbers Point Aviation Museum, Oahu, Hawaii
 163944- MAG-24 Headquarters, MCAS Kaneohe Bay, Hawaii
 164578- Naval Aviation Museum, NAS Pensacola, Florida
 165329- Joint Base McGuire, New Jersey
 165359- Naval Test Pilots' School, NAS Patuxent River, Maryland
 165367- MCAS Kaneohe Bay, Hawaii
 165369- MCAS Camp Pendleton, California
 165395- MCAS Yuma, Arizona

Specifications

AH-1J SeaCobra

AH-1W SuperCobra

See also

References

Citations

Bibliography

External links

 AH-1 Cobra page and AH-1W Air Combat Maneuver Training on GlobalSecurity.org
 AH-1W Super Cobra page on fas.org
 AH-1 Cobra page on GlobalAircraft.org
 AH-1 Cobra briefing room on AirCav.com
 AH-1 HueyCobra page on Rotorhead.org
 AH-1 Cobra Photo Galleries on MidwaySailor.com

H-001, A
United States military helicopters
1970s United States attack aircraft
1970s United States helicopters
Aircraft first flown in 1969
Single-turbine helicopters
Twin-turbine helicopters
Attack helicopters